The House of Rosetti (also spelled Ruset, Rosset, Rossetti) was a Moldavian boyar princely family of Byzantine Greek and Italian (from Genoa) origins. There are several branches of the family named after their estates: Roznovanu, Solescu, Bălănescu, Răducanu, Ciortescu, Tescanu, and Bibica. The Rosetti family in Wallachia is another branch of the family who initially settled in Moldavia.

Notable members

Alexandru Rosetti, linguist
Elena Cuza, philanthropist; the Princess consort of the United Principalities and the wife of Prince Alexandru Ioan Cuza
C. A. Rosetti, Prime Minister, statesman, and writer
Maria Rosetti, political activist, journalist, philanthropist and socialite
Maria Tescanu Rosetti, lady-in-waiting 
Radu D. Rosetti, poet
Radu R. Rosetti, general and historian
Theodor Rosetti, writer, journalist and politician who served as Prime Minister of Romania
Nicolae Rosetti-Bălănescu, lawyer and politician
Emanuel Giani Ruset, Prince of Wallachia, and Prince of Moldavia

See also
Roznovanu Palace

References

External links

Palatul Primăriei, în vâltoarea istoriei 

 
Phanariotes
Romanian boyar families
Romanian nobility